Marlow is a suburb of the Central Coast region of New South Wales, Australia on the north bank of the Hawkesbury River  north of Sydney. It is part of the  local government area.

Although the northern boundary and Greenman Valley Recreation Park are reachable via a dirt track from the Sydney-Newcastle Freeway at Mount White, most of the suburb is only reachable by boat, and a ferry transports mail and groceries to the residents.

References

Suburbs of the Central Coast (New South Wales)
Hawkesbury River